Qarah Takan or Qarah Tekan or Qareh Tekan may refer to:
 Qareh Tekan, Ardabil
 Qarah Takan, Razavi Khorasan
 Qarah Tikan, a village in Razavi Khorasan Province